Tsai Chung-han (born 1943) is a Taiwanese Amis politician. He was a member of the Legislative Yuan from 1987 to 2005.

Personal life
Tsai is of Amis descent. He earned a master's degree in international studies at Soochow University, followed by a doctorate in sociology at the University of Tokyo, and was one of 21 people of indigenous descent interviewed for the book The Story of their Lives: the Academic Path of Taiwan's Aboriginal Doctorate Holders, which stated that, from 1945 to 2004, there were 23 indigenous people to have earned a doctorate. He has taught with the Social Science Center at National Chengchi University, served as an associate professor at Tamkang University, a visiting professor at Peking University, and a lecturer at Ryutsu Keizai University.

Political career
Tsai was elected to the First Legislative Yuan in 1986 and 1990, as a representative of what became the Lowland Aborigine Constituency, under the Kuomintang banner. He remained affiliated with the Kuomintang during the second and third convocations of the Legislative Yuan. In 1987, martial law was lifted, and Tsai became an advocate for the sailors captured during the Tuapse incident. His efforts and press coverage by the Independence Evening Post led President Lee Teng-hui to release all remaining captives in 1988. In 2001, Tsai returned to the Legislative Yuan via the party list of the People First Party.

As a legislator, Tsai took a lead role in the review of indigenous welfare policies, and commented on biomedical research involving indigenous people. In 2004, Tsai took part in protests that occurred after vice president Annette Lu stated that the Taiwanese indigenous peoples were not the original inhabitants of Taiwan, including a hunger strike.

In 2004, Liu Wen-hsiung, Jaw Shaw-kong and Tsai accused Chen Shui-bian of sexually harassing Mireya Moscoso. Separately, Chen and Moscoso sued the trio of accusers. The Taipei District Court issued a decision on Chen's lawsuit against Liu, Jaw, and Tsai in January 2006, ruling that Jaw was not guilty, but that Liu and Tsai had to publish public apologies in major Chinese-language newspapers.

References

1943 births
Living people
Amis people
Aboriginal Members of the Legislative Yuan
Party List Members of the Legislative Yuan
Members of the 1st Legislative Yuan in Taiwan
Members of the 2nd Legislative Yuan
Members of the 3rd Legislative Yuan
Members of the 4th Legislative Yuan
Members of the 5th Legislative Yuan
Kuomintang Members of the Legislative Yuan in Taiwan
People First Party Members of the Legislative Yuan
University of Tokyo alumni
Soochow University (Taiwan) alumni
Academic staff of Tamkang University
Taiwanese expatriates in China
Taiwanese expatriates in Japan
Hunger strikers